The Kyrgyz language is written in the Kyrgyz alphabet, a modification of Cyrillic. There is no commonly accepted system of romanization for Kyrgyz, i.e. a rendering of Kyrgyz in the Latin alphabet. For geographic names, the Kyrgyz government adopted the BGN/PCGN romanization system. There have been periodic discussions about changing the country's official writing system to Latin script. These proposals have seen little progress as the Cyrillic alphabet is more firmly established in Kyrgyzstan than in other post-Soviet Turkic states, which have either successfully switched to Latin script (Azerbaijan, Turkmenistan) or are in active transition (Kazakhstan, Uzbekistan). Some Kyrgyz romanization systems are given below:

See also
Kyrgyz alphabet
Kyrgyz language

References

External links
 The Working Group on Romanization Systems of the United Nations.
 Kyrgyz Cyrillic – Latin – Arabic – Old turkic converter
 Transliteration of Non-Roman Scripts, a collection of writing systems and transliteration tables, by Thomas T. Pedersen. Includes PDF reference charts for many languages' transliteration systems – Kirghiz.pdf (PDF file)

Kyrgyz
Kyrgyz language